Music 3000 (known in North America as Funkmaster Flex's Digital Hitz Factory) is a music video game developed and published by Jester Interactive exclusively for PlayStation 2. It is the only rhythm game to feature Funkmaster Flex in the title for release in North America.

Reception

The game received "average" reviews according to the review aggregation website Metacritic. Official U.S. PlayStation Magazine called it "One of the most comprehensive entries in the music-creation genre." IGN said of the game, "The Voice 2 Music feature is enough to merit that purchase by itself." PSM said, "With patience, DHF can deliver with massive funkmaster flexibility." However, Game Informer said that Jester Interactive had "screwed up the once-intuitive interface, replacing it with this monstrosity, which makes everything dependent on using the right analog stick and the clumsy R3 button."

References

External links
 

2003 video games
Cancelled Xbox games
Jester Interactive games
Multiplayer and single-player video games
Music video games
PlayStation 2 games
PlayStation 2-only games
Video games based on real people
Video games developed in the United Kingdom